Outardes-4 is a hydroelectric power station and dam on the Outardes River  northwest of Baie-Comeau, Quebec, Canada. The power station was commissioned in 1969 and is supplied by the Outardes-4 Reservoir which is created by seven additional dams.

Construction
Outardes-4 was built in conjunction with the Manicouagan-Outardes project and is the northernmost power station on the Outardes River. Construction on the diversion tunnel for the Outardes River began in September 1964 and was finished in April 1965. A cofferdam was constructed upstream to direct the river into the diversion tunnel; none was built downstream because the river's grade was sufficient. Once the river was diverted, work commenced on Dam No. 1's foundation. Workers and engineers cleared alluvial material from the riverbed but ran into uplift faults and pot-holes. Eventually, those under the dam's foundation were filled in with concrete.

Dams
The Outardes-4 Reservoir is impounded by eight different dams. The main dam is Dam No. 1 and is a rock-fill, earthen embankment dam along with Dam No. 2. The six other dams are saddle and auxiliary dams; one is rock and earth-fill, four are earth-fill dikes and one serves as a controlled concrete spillway. Water from the reservoir helps regulate river flow and power generation at the downstream Outardes-3 and Outardes-2 power stations.

Power station
The Outardes-4 power station is located on the west bank of the Outardes River, adjacent to Dam No. 1. The power station was commissioned in 1969 and currently has a 785 MW capacity. The power station's turbines were rehabilitated in 2009 which had increased generation capacity by 56 MW.

See also

 Outardes-2
 Outardes-3
 McCormick Dam
 Jean-Lesage generating station
 René-Lévesque generating station
 Daniel-Johnson Dam
 History of Hydro-Québec
 List of hydroelectric stations in Quebec

Notes

References
 .

Dams in Quebec
Manicouagan-Outardes hydroelectric project
Dams completed in 1969
Energy infrastructure completed in 1969
Dams on the Outardes River
Publicly owned dams in Canada